The 69 Commando (Jawi: ٦٩ كومندو); also known as Very Able Troopers 69 (abbreviation: VAT 69) is an elite multi-tasking special forces unit of the Royal Malaysia Police. The VAT 69 is based at Ulu Kinta, Perak and together with Special Actions Unit, they are part of Pasukan Gerakan Khas (abbreviated PGK). The mission of 69 Commando is to conduct high-risk tasks such as counter-terrorism, hostage rescue, intelligence gathering and counter-insurgency within the borders of Malaysia.

Prior to 1989, the 69 Commando was primarily tasked with the war against communist terrorists in the Malaysian jungle. Today, 69 Commando has much wider counter-terrorism and counter-insurgency role, but it still maintains considerable expertise in jungle warfare; many of their operators are drawn from the Senoi Praaq, an elite tracking unit which is now part of RMP's General Operations Force.

History

VAT 69, also known as Task Force, Charlie Force and Special Project Team, was founded in 1969 (hence the number 69) and is modelled on the British 22nd Special Air Service Regiment, as a small combat unit to counter the tactics and techniques of communist terrorists. The idea for an elite counter-terrorist paramilitary police unit was originally proposed the Minister of Home Affairs and Internal Security, The Honorable Allahyarham (late) Tun Dr Ismail to fight the communist insurgency.

In October 1969, 1,600 officers and men from the Police Field Force applied for VAT 69 training of which 60 passed the basic commando training tests. A group of instructors from SAS were sent to Fort Kemar, Perak to supervise the training of the first 69 Commando recruits. Only 30 police officers managed to pass and they formed the first nucleus troop of 69 Commando Battalion. The official name for VAT 69 at that time was Pasukan Polis Hutan 69; PPH 69 (Police Field Force 69) and they were part of Police Field Force (now General Operations Force).

In the 1970s, VAT 69 started its initial operations and was successfully deployed against the Malayan National Liberation Army (MNLA) during the Second Malayan Emergency. VAT 69 was responsible for neutralizing a significant number of MNLA guerrillas and seizing large amounts of weapons and equipment. VAT 69 cooperated closely with the Senoi Praaq Regiment, an exclusively Orang Asli police light infantry unit, in operations against pro-Communist ASAL groups, which were composed of Orang Asli sympathisers of the Malayan Communists.

In 1977, three new squadrons were raised and trained by the New Zealand Special Air Service and a special course was conducted to train their own instructors. This expansion program was completed in 1980 and VAT 69 had fully equipped units with its own logistics department.

In 1978, 65 officers and operators from VAT 69 were sent to Hua Hin, Thailand to be trained by instructors from the Parachuting Training Centre of Border Patrol Police, Royal Thai Police. The course lasted for a month and the trainee learned to jump via static line insertion.

Merger in Pasukan Gerakan Khas 
On 20 October 1997, under then Prime Minister Mahathir Muhammad and then Inspector-General of Police Tan Sri Rahim Noor.; the Royal Malaysia Police re-organised VAT 69 and UTK under one unified special operations command known as Pasukan Gerakan Khas (PGK; Police SOCOM). Although amalgamated into one directorate, they are essentially still two separate entities operating in two distinct operational environments.

Functions 

VAT 69 roles are believed to include:
 Intelligence collection in deep reconnaissance missions and warfare.
 Special operations to support the RMP Special Branch in combating subversive organisations or terrorist activities.
 Counter-terrorism operations inside Malaysian territory in conjunction with armed forces.
 Law enforcement operations in dealing with armed criminals inside Malaysian territory.
 Counter-terrorism operations outside Malaysian territory; including Operation Astute in Timor Leste.
 Search and rescue operations inside or outside Malaysian territory, such as aid operations in the aftermath of the 2004 tsunami in Acheh, Indonesia.
 Support in term of technique and training to the other RMP elite units; namely STAFOC, STING and STAGG

Identity

Sand coloured berets 

The sand coloured beret was bestowed by 22nd Special Air Service when the original VAT 69 troop was founded and trained by SAS instructors. The sand-coloured beret then given back to the VAT 69 after the beret was officially accepted as an official headdress of VAT 69 on 18 December 2004 by the then Inspector-General of Police, Tan Sri Mohd Bakri Omar.

On 14 November 2006, for the first time in the history of Royal Malaysian Police, the maroon and sand-coloured berets of PGK were honoured as Royal Berets by Yang Dipertuan Agong Tuanku Syed Sirajuddin Syed Putera Jamalullail, the then King of Malaysia.

Parachute wings 
These wings, worn on the left arm of the uniform, identify the wearer as a qualified parachutist, airborne unit and air assault operations operator. The parachute wings are mostly worn by operators from Pasukan Gerakan Khas and are awarded on completion of the Basic Tactical Parachuting Course.

VAT 69 Commando emblem and insignia
Motto
Warisan Darah Perwira (Inheritance of The Blood of Warriors)
Black
Black symbolises the highly secretive nature of VAT 69 operations.
Red
Red symbolises bravery.
Yellow
Yellow symbolises "Loyalty to King and Country".
Javelin
Lembing, another traditional weapon used by Malay warriors.
Two pieces of the curved Kerambit dagger.
Arranged to form the number 69, signifying stealth and efficiency.

Organisation

There are four infantry squadrons in VAT 69 Commando with its own logistics unit, totaling around 1,900 members. Squadrons are split into patrol teams consisting of six to ten operatives led by a Police Inspector (Insp) or Superintendent of Police (SUPT). Within each patrol, individual members may specialise in sniping, explosive ordnance disposal, demolitions, communications and as field medics.

Previously separate entities, both the VAT 69 and the UTK were amalgamated into the PGK Command on 20 October 1997, when it was launched by the 5th Inspector-General of Police, Tan Sri Rahim Noor.  However, VAT 69 and the UTK are still operational as separate units. The UTK is now officially known as Pasukan Gerakan Khas Detachment A and VAT 69 has been deputised to Pasukan Gerakan Khas Detachment B.

Based at the Royal Malaysia Police Headquarters in Bukit Aman, Kuala Lumpur, the PGK is under the direct command of the RMP's Internal and Public Security Director. The unit commander holds the rank of Senior Assistant Commissioner (SAC) and is the Deputy Director of the Internal and Public Security Branch.

Roles
Originally established to counter the communist threat during the insurgency years; VAT 69 was raised and trained by the British SAS to specialise in jungle warfare, deep reconnaissance and counter-insurgency. Originally trained by the British SAS, VAT 69 commandos conduct land, sea and air special operation techniques, with a specialty in jungle warfare and deep reconnaissance missions. They execute special operations in support of the Police Special Branch fight against subversive organisations and terrorist activities, conduct offensive operations using special weapons and tactics, counter-terrorism, counter-insurgency, hostage rescue, close protection and supporting the special forces, Rapid Deployment Force or infantry force of the Malaysian Armed Forces in any security measures.

With the growing threat of terrorism since the 11 September attacks, this unit has increasingly adapted itself to conduct counter-terrorism duties. With the aim of creating teams that are capable of dealing with a broad range of operations (especially counter-terrorism operations), the PGK has forged closer relations with the special forces of the Malaysian Armed Forces, including the 10th Paratrooper Brigade, Grup Gerak Khas, PASKAL and PASKAU, so as to enable them to more effectively enforce security within Malaysia's borders.

VAT 69's and UTK's snipers, technicians and explosive expertise specialists regularly cross-train with foreign special forces including the Special Air Service Regiments of Australia, New Zealand and the United Kingdom, the Royal Thai Border Patrol Police, and a number of U.S. services including the Army Green Berets, Navy SEALs and others.

In 2014, RMP establishes new elite units (STAFOC, STING and STAGG). UTK and VAT 69 is given another role which is to support these three new units in term of training and technical capabilities.

Recruitment, selection and training

All members of the Malaysian police services with two years of service can enter the Basic 69 Commando Course. To enter the commando course, the police personnel need to enter and pass the Kursus Asas Pasukan Gerakan Am (PGA) (General Operations Force (GOF) Basic Course) which last for three months. Trainees will learn jungle operations during the GOF Basic Course. Because of this, many of VAT 69 operators are drawn from the GOF personnel.

The Basic 69 Commando Course lasts for three months training period, which includes thirteen weeks of basic training and nine weeks of advanced training. A primary selection period is as long as two days. Depending on the department's policy, officers generally have to serve a minimum tenure within the department before being able to apply for a specialist section such as VAT 69 & UTK. This tenure requirement is based on the fact that PGK officers are still law enforcement officers and must have a thorough knowledge of department policies and procedures. To be eligible to join the PGK special forces, one must be younger than 30 years old and have a good health record.

Prospective trainees are expected to exceed the minimum requirements of the Physical Screening Test (PST), which requires that trainees must be able to:
 Run 3.2 km in 11 minutes or less
 Swim freestyle for at least 8–10 laps
 Do at least 9–13 chin-ups
 Do at least 30 sit-ups
 Do at least 60 push-ups
 Do at least 30 squat thrusts

Basic 69 Commando Course 
In Basic 69 Commando Course, it has three phases which are:

First Phase
Trainees will spend most of their time mastering patrol techniques.

Second Phase
In this phase, all trainees will learn skills and lessons such as tracking, communication, field medical and explosive. This also involves making booby traps, explosives and various demolition techniques.

Third Phase
Final movement test where the trainees are tested in all aspects of the skills and lessons that they had learned. At the moment, special attention is given to trainees who show leadership potential.

Advanced Training 
To accomplish its varied mission profiles, the 69 Commando ensures that its members are well trained in the required aspects of special operations. These include:

Insertion Techniques
 HALO/HAHO
 Fast roping techniques
 Helo casting
 Abseiling
 Combat diving

Combat Techniques
 Close Quarters Combat – CQC
 Counter-insurgency
 Unconventional warfare
 Sabotage
 Close VIP protection
 Vehicular assault
 Unarmed combat
 Knife combat
 Marksmanship
 Booby-trap defusal
 Underwater demolitions

Intelligence Gathering
 Intelligence
 Counter-intelligence
 Special reconnaissance
 Long-range Combat Patrol

Task Oriented
 Aircraft Hijackings
 Car stops
 Combat, Search and Rescue (CSAR)
 Coordinate multi-location warrant service
 Dignitary protection
 Explosive Ordnance Disposal (EOD)
 Foreign language
 Fugitive tracking (in rural environments)
 Hazmat Disposal
 High risk arrests (armed and dangerous subjects)
 Hostage rescue (HR)
 K9 Handling
 Operations in WMD environments
 Site surveys for high visibility events
 Specialized sniper operations
 Stronghold assaults (structures requiring specialised breaching equipment that local law enforcement might not have access to)
 Tubular assaults (aircraft, trains, buses, etc.)

The 69 Commando is known to conduct joint training exercises and participate in exchange programs with Commonwealth special units such as the Australian SAS, New Zealand SAS, British SAS and Singapore Special Tactics and Rescue. The 69 Commando routinely trains with neighbouring nations' tactical teams such as the Indonesian Mobile Brigade and Thailand Border Patrol Police. Occasionally, the 69 Commando trains with Green Berets, Army Special Operations Command Pacific Unit (SOCPAC) of the United States and other international units.

On 10 December 2003, the then Inspector-General of Police, Tan Sri Mohd Bakri Haji Omar, launched the training program between the USSOCPAC and the VAT 69 at the GOF Training Center in Ulu Kinta, Perak. The SOCPAC team were to conduct joint exercise with the PGK, under the code-name Advance Vector Balance Mint for a duration of 2 weeks. Only 42 out of the 194 participants completed the inaugural program.

Equipment

69 Commando teams use equipment designed for a variety of specialist situations. The particular pieces of equipment vary from unit to unit, but there are some consistent trends in what they wear and use. Much of their equipment is indistinguishable from that supplied to the military, not least because much of it is military surplus.

Weapons

As a special forces unit, the 69 Commando is equipped with a wide variety of high-class weapons and support equipment commonly associated with counter-terrorism operations, the most common weapons include sub-machine guns, assault rifles, shotguns, machine-guns and sniper rifles.

Tactical vehicles
As a special forces unit, the 69 Commando employs a number of specialised vehicles to accomplish its missions. These include the Commando V-150D and the GKN Sankey AT105 armoured personnel carriers equipped with M60s as assault vehicles in urban and jungle terrain as well as modified police MPV (Mobile Patrol Vehicles), vans, trucks, 4WD and buses for use as tactical vehicles. PGK also employs RHIB assault boats, jet-skis and Marine Subskimmer (DPV) in maritime missions and amphibious insertions.

For its airborne operations, 69 Commando utilises the C-130 Hercules, Cessna 206G, Cessna 208 Caravan 1 and Pilatus Porter PC-6 aircraft as well as the E-Squirrel AS-355 F2/AS-355N helicopter.

Development and acquisitions
On 25 October 2007, the US Joint Interagency Task Force (JIATF) West funded RM2 million state-of-the-art shooting house for the VAT 69 Commando battalion was opened.

69 Commando will get their own base after 47 years sharing base with the General Operations Force Northern Brigade. The new base estimated to be fully operational in 2017.

Killed in the line of duty

Missions

Operation Dawn 
Its first counter-terrorism mission, which is one of the most well-known and which established the unit's reputation as an elite unit, was an operation known as "Operasi Subuh"/"Operasi Khas 304" (Operations Dawn/Special Operation 304). It was carried out on 3 July 2000 against the militants of Al-Ma'unah who had stolen ninety-seven M16 rifles, two Steyr AUG rifles, four General Purpose Machine Guns (GPMG), six light machine guns (LMG), five M203 grenade launchers, twenty-six bayonet daggers and thousands of ammunition rounds from two control posts of the Rejimen Askar Wataniah (Territorial Army Regiment) camp in Kuala Rui, Perak and captured two police officers, one army special forces soldier and one villager as hostages and planned to commit treason against a democratically elected government.

In the dawn of 5 July 2000, police and military units created a distraction, while members of the PGK led by 69 Commando Battalion leader ASP Abd Razak Mohd Yusof, accompanied by the 22nd Grup Gerak Khas led by Malaysian Army senior officer Lt. Gen. (Ret.) Zaini Mohamad Said, were sent to Sauk to negotiate with the Al-Ma'unah leader, Mohamed Amin Mohamed Razali.

Amin, along with his comrades, were persuaded to drop their arms and surrender to the security forces. Although most of the group initially surrendered, negotiations eventually broke down and a bloody gunfight ensued. In these incidents, 2 of the 4 hostages were killed before the group finally surrendered. The security forces suffered two casualties – police Special Branch officer Detective Corporal R. Sanghadevan and Trooper Matthew anak Medan from 22nd GGK were tortured before they were killed and was buried by 2 other hostages, Sergeant (R) Mohd Shah Ahmad and civilian Jaafar Puteh, in the jungle before they were both rescued by the security forces. Abdul Halim Ali @ Ahmad, a member of the militant group, was shot dead in the firefight and five others were injured, including two seriously. The other 22 were taken into police custody. Mohamed Amin, Zahit Muslim, Jemari Jusoh and Jamaludin Darus were later sentenced to death and the other 16 were sentenced to life imprisonment. 10 more comrades, Megat Mohamed Hanafi Ilias, Muhamad Nukhshah Bandi Che Mansor, Riduan Berahim, Azlan Abdul Ghani, Shahidi Ali and Khairul Anuar Mohamed Ariffin, were sentenced by the High Court to ten years in jail each after pleading guilty to an alternative charge under Section 122 for preparing to wage war against the Yang di-Pertuan Agong after they pleaded guilty to the lesser charge.

Publicly known missions
 1970s: 69 Commandos led by ASP Zabri Abd Hamid together with Indonesian Army KOSTRAD combated the PARAKU in Kalimantan jungles.
 1994: One of the Philippine MNLF organisations, Rizal Aleh and his father escaped from the Philippines and hid in a village of Sabah where he started piracy activities. 69 Commandos led by DSP Mohd Noor Razak within operations code-named Ops Bamboo II was sent to Sabah to infiltrate him. Mohd Noor was shot by Rizal at his leg during a struggle with him. Both were successfully captured and sentenced by the National Court after pleading guilty for his criminal activities in Sabah. Later, both Rizal and his father were sent back to the Philippines Government.
 1998: The Pasukan Gerakan Khas and the Grup Gerak Khas were deployed to provide security and were on standby for hostage rescue, close protection and counter-terrorism duties during the 1998 Commonwealth Games held at National Stadium, Bukit Jalil, Kuala Lumpur on 11 to 21 September 1998.
 20 September 1998: In the twilight hours, by orders from the then Prime Minister to the Inspector-General of Police, Tan Sri Rahim Noor, 69th Commando PGK operatives led by Inspector Mazlan arrested the ex-Deputy Prime Minister Dato' Sri Anwar Ibrahim in his home 18 days after his ejection from the Cabinet, for inciting anti-Mahathir reforms in Kuala Lumpur. He was initially arrested under the Internal Security Act and was subsequently charged with, and convicted of, corruption and sodomy. 6 years later in 2004 when he was serving his jail sentence for sodomy after completing his sentence for corruption, he was released when his sodomy conviction was overturned by the Federal Court in the case of Dato’ Seri Anwar b. Ibrahim & Sukma Darmawan Sasmitaat Madja Lwn. Pendakwa Raya.
5 July 2000: The militant group Al-Ma'unah stole thousands of military firearms and planned to commit treason against a democratically elected government. The members of 69 Commando and the 22nd GGK stormed the group's camp at Sauk, Malaysia and rescued two hostages while two other hostages were killed.
 12 September 2002: Ahmad Mohd Arshad or Mat Komando, 37, the leader of Gang 13, then No. 1 on the Malaysian Most-Wanted-Criminal list for 52 armed robberies involving about RM2.5 million, armed assault and illegal possession of firearms (among others), was known to be hiding in a Kampung Hujung Keton, the village in the state of Kedah on the west coast of the Malay Peninsula. Armed with intelligence gathered from surveillance and villagers, 10 police officers from 69 Commando anti-terror police, supported by the GOF paramilitary police, cordoned off the area and stormed a hut in the village for the takedown. Sensing the presence of law enforcement officials in dawn 12, 6 September.30 am, Mat Komando opened fire and in the ensuing shoot-out, was shot in the head and left ribs and was killed. The police seized a Colt .45 pistol with three rounds of ammunition and a S&W Model 617 .22 revolver with two rounds of ammunition, two bullet shells from the deceased criminal. The then Malaysian Inspector-General of Police, Tan Sri Norian Mai (Retired), said that Mat Komando was the fourth member of the Gang 13 members to be killed in shoot-outs against police while the remaining nine members had been arrested.
 Participated in hostage rescue operations against Abu Sayyaf in Sipadan Island (Pulau Sipadan) and Ligitan Island (Pulau Ligitan), Sabah with support from GOF, the Malaysian Armed Forces and Philippine Armed Forces.
 2003: Arrested six Jemaah Islamiyah suspect terrorists, Mohd Khaider Kadran (JI leader), Wan Amin Wan Hamat, Sulaiman Suramin, Sufian Salih, Ahmad Muaz Al Bakry and Hasim Talib.
 16 October 2003/17 October 2003: Involved in VVIP protection of the Islamic leaders during the 10th Organisation of the Islamic Conference (OIC) in Putrajaya.
 16 December 2004: Participated in the search and rescue mission for the lost Indonesian BRIMOB, in which 700 personnel from the POLRI special operations force units went missing in Acheh after the tsunami incident.
 23 August 2005: Five officers and 32 members of the 69 Commandos of PGK counter-terrorist operatives flown to Kukup, Pontian for the intercept operations of a ship seized the Panama-registered 567-tonne vessel MV Natris which was renamed MV Paulijing, laden with soybeans and vinegar, believed to run off Batam waters, Indonesia. The ship was detected by the Marine Operations Force in the Malacca Straits after reported missing in 2003. This operation was named Operation MV Paulijing. The operation also involves members of the SWAT units of the Marine Operations Force which resulting arrested 20 Chinese crews including the captain when they refused to heed to the order by the police authorities.
 2006: Deployed as part of the United Nations (U.N.) INTERFET to support the Operation Astute.  It consisted of Malaysian U.N. 10 Paratrooper Brigade, Grup Gerak Khas, Australian and New Zealand U.N Armed Forces in Timor Leste.
 July 2007: Deployed in a search and rescue operation after a Sikorsky S61 Nuri helicopter of the RMAF went down along with a crew of six near Genting Sempah, Genting Highlands. The SAR team, which consisted of the U.S. Navy Air Fleet from U.S.S. Jarrett, 10 Paratrooper Brigade, the 22nd GGK, PASKAU, the Police's General Operations Force Senoi Praaq, Police Air Wing, Fire and Rescue Department, Forestry Department rangers, Civil Defense Department (JPA3) and the villagers, located the wreckage of the helicopter on 17 July 1324 hrs with its rotor blades detached. The bodies of all crew members were found in the cabin of the stricken aircraft.

 2010: Intercepted the Sultan of Kelantan's motorcade (escorts) 30m outside of the Kelantan Royal Palace as they were heading for the Sultan Ismail Petra Airport to depart for Singapore pending further treatment at Mount Elizabeth Hospital. The team then brought the Sultan, himself not willingly, to the nearby hospital (HUSM) somewhere 200m from the Palace.
 2013: Deployed in Lahad Datu, Sabah during the Lahad Datu conflict. The 69 Commando members were involved in hunting down a terrorist group, numbering approximately 200 in strength, from the self-styled "Royal Security Forces of the Sultanate of Sulu and North Borneo," while UTK members were deployed in urban and populated areas to defend them. The commandos were the main assault team during the early stage of the conflict. Two officers were gunned down and three more wounded in an unexpected "white flag" ambush by the Sulu terrorists, while 12 of the terrorists were shot to death in retaliation and three other terrorists were fatally wounded.
 2 March 2013: Officers and members of the 69 Commandos who were deployed to Lahad Datu as reinforcements rescued police officers who were trapped in an ambush by less than ten Sulu terrorists in Kampung Seri Jaya Siminul, Semporna. The terrorists, armed with AK-47 and M16 rifles, had ambushed the officers during a surveillance operation. In the ambush, six officers were downed, while six terrorists also killed after the officers launched the counter-attack.
 19 May 2015: A team of roughly 300 operators from the 69 Commandos were deployed to the Malaysia–Thailand border to search and curb the human trafficking activities in the region.

Notable members 
 ASP G/3427 Mohd Zabri Abdul Hamid, S.P., former commander of 3rd Platoon, VAT 69 during Communist insurgency in Malaysia. He was killed in action on 1975 in Grik, Perak by a booby trap. Because of his heroic, he was posthumously promoted to Assistant Superintendent (ASP). In 2014, ASP Zabri was posthumously awarded with the Seri Pahlawan Gagah Perkasa (S.P.), the highest and most distinguished Federal awards.
 SAC G/10958 Dato' Abdul Razak Mohd Yusof, S.P., BMS, PKT, BKT, is a senior officer of VAT 69. He was awarded Seri Pahlawan Gagah Perkasa (S.P.) in 2001 because of his heroic act in Operation Dawn. In Operation Dawn, then-ASP Abdul Razak and his VAT 69 operators infiltrate into al-Ma'unah stronghold and manage to persuade al-Ma'unah leader, Mohamed Amin Mohamed Razali to surrender without a fight.
 ASP NAVARATNAM

In popular culture 

Books and televisions.
 2005: "VAT 69 - Warisan Darah Perwira", a docudrama by Astro and directed by late Senator, Dato' Jins Shamsuddin. It is about tactics and professionalism of VAT 69.
 2010: "VAT 69: Malaysia's Very Able Troopers", a documentary by History Channel Asia about VAT 69 history and formations.
 2011: "Wira Padang Pasir", a TV drama by Astro, about an ex-VAT 69 turn UTK operator now working as a Malaysian Embassy bodyguard in Cairo, Egypt.
 2016: "Kerambit", a TV series by RTM and directed by Zul Huzaimy. The series is about Intelligence Squad of VAT 69.

See also

 Elite Forces of Malaysia

Notes

References

External links 
 Berita Harian Online: VAT 69 digeruni komunis (In Malay language).

Government agencies established in 1997
Law enforcement units
Law enforcement in Malaysia
Organizations established in 1997
Counterterrorism in Malaysia
Police units of Malaysia
Royal Malaysia Police
Special forces of Malaysia
Non-military counterterrorist organizations
National law enforcement agencies of Malaysia